Adriana Rebeca Vieyra Olivares (born 24 August 1961) is a Mexican politician from the National Action Party. From 2006 to 2009 she served as Deputy of the LX Legislature of the Mexican Congress representing Morelos.

References

1951 births
Living people
Politicians from Morelos
Women members of the Chamber of Deputies (Mexico)
National Action Party (Mexico) politicians
21st-century Mexican politicians
21st-century Mexican women politicians
Universidad Autónoma del Estado de Morelos alumni
Universidad Popular Autónoma del Estado de Puebla alumni
Deputies of the LX Legislature of Mexico
Members of the Chamber of Deputies (Mexico) for Morelos